The 2013 Golden Icons Academy Movie Awards was the second edition of the ceremony to reward excellence in African cinema. It was hosted by Ramsey Nouah.

Awards

Categories
 Best Motion Picture
 Brother's Keeper (2014 film)
 Finding Mercy (film)
 Torn (2013 Nigerian film)
 Contract (2012 film)
 Ninah’s Dowry
 Phone Swap

 Best Drama
Hunters
On Bended knees
House of Gold
Desperate Housegirls
Finding Mercy
Torn (2013 Nigerian film)

 Best Cinematography
 Red Hot
 Last Flight to Abuja
 Weekend Getaway
 Phone Swap
 Brother's Keeper (2014 film)
 Contract (2012 film)

 Best Comedy
 Okon goes to School
 Cheaters
 Mrs Somebody
 Lies men Tell
 Phone Swap
 House of Gold

 Best Costume
The Twin Sword
Weekend Getaway
House of Gold
Volunteers
The Gods are Still not to Blame
Keeping my Man

 Most Promising Actress (Best New Actress)
Mary Lazarus – Desperate House girls
Omawumi Megbele – House of Gold
Mbufung Seikeh – Ninah’s dowry
Okawa Shaznay – Cheaters
Tamara Eteimo – Desperate House Girls
Itz Tiffany – Single and Married

 Best Actress
Ireti Doyle – Torn (2013 Nigerian film)
Rita Dominic – Finding Mercy (film)
Jackie Appiah – Hunters
Omoni Oboli – Brother's Keeper (2014 film)
Chioma Chukwuka – On Bended Knees
Yvonne Okoro – Contract (2012 film)
Nse Ikpe Etim – Phone Swap

 Best Supporting Actress
Monalisa Chinda Torn (2013 Nigerian film)
Uru Ekeh – Weekend Getaway
Keira Hewatch Lies men Tell
Roselyn Ngissah – Letter to my Mother
Betty Olumowe – Scam
Kate Henshaw-Nuttal – False

 Most Promising Actor (Best New Actor)
Bobby Obodo – The Volunteers
Anurin Nwunembom – Ninah’s Dowry
Wale Ojo – Phone Swap
Umar Krupp – House of Gold
Blossom Chukwujekwu – Finding Mercy (film)
Seun Akindele – On Bended Knees

 Best Actor
Kalu Ikeagwu – False
Adjetey Anang – Hunters
Hlomla Dandala – Contract (2012 film)
Majid Michel – Brother's Keeper (2014 film)
OC Ukeje – Alan Poza
Yemi Blaq – Bridge of Hope

 Best Supporting Actor
Joseph Benjamin (actor) – Torn (2013 Nigerian film)
Eddie Watson – Letter to my Mother
Alex Ekubo – Weekend Getaway
Francis Odega – House of Gold
Chet Anekwe – On Bended Knees
Uti Nwachukwu – Finding Mercy (film)

 Best Director
Moses Inwang – Torn (2013 Nigerian film)
Kunle Afolayan – Phone Swap
Ikechukwu Onyeka – Brother's Keeper (2014 film)
Desmond Elliott – Finding Mercy (film)
Victor Viyuoh – Ninah’s Dowry
Pascal Amanfo – House of Gold

 Best Original Screenplay
Phone Swap - Kemi Adesoye
Torn (2013 Nigerian film)
Finding Mercy (film)
Desperate Housegirls
House of Gold
False

 Best Sound
Last Flight to Abuja
Red Hot
Finding Mercy (film)
Contract (2012 film)
Hunters
Mrs. Somebody

 Producer of the Year
Moses Inwang – Torn (2013 Nigerian film)
Che Hilaire – Ninah’s Dowry
Abdul Salam – Hunters
Kunle Afolayan – Phone Swap
Uduak Isong – Desperate Housegirls
Yvonne Okoro – Contract (2012 film)

 Best Original Soundtrack
Hunters
Mrs Somebody
Ninah’s Dowry
Weekend Getaway
Bridge of Hope
Cheaters

 Best Film Diaspora
Still Standing [USA]
Feathered Dreams [Ukraine]
Unguarded [USA]
When One door Closes [USA]

 Best Film Director – Diaspora
Andrew Rozhen – Feathered Dreams
Desmond Elliot & Bethels Agomuoh – Unguarded
Michael Uadiale – Still Standing
Robert Peters – When one door loses

 Best Actor - Viewer's Choice
 Mike Ezuruonye
 Best Actress - Viewer's Choice
 Ini Edo

Honorary Awards
 Honorary Lifetime Achievement Award
Richard Mofe Damijo
 Honorary Directing Achievement Award
Lancelot Oduwa Imasuen

References

African film awards
2013 film awards